Drums & Tuba was an instrumental rock group. The band formed in Austin, Texas, before relocating to New York City. Their sound fuses electronic rock, progressive rock, jazz and occasionally industrial. They were signed to Righteous Babe Records.

History
The group began as a duo with Brian Wolff and Tony Nozero performing weekend nights for tips on Sixth Street in downtown Austin. The band was originally called "Just Drums & Tuba" and consisted only of a drummer (Nozero) and tuba player (Wolff). They eventually added a guitarist (Neal McKeeby) to their lineup.

Musical style
Their music combined many disparate genres, including jazz fusion, alternative hip hop, and hardcore punk. Their live performances sometimes included McKeeby playing two guitars simultaneously, and Wolff using effects boards as well as his tuba. They have been compared to Sonic Youth, Soul Coughing, the guitar sound of Grateful Dead, Isotope 217, and Tortoise.

Discography
Box Fetish (1997)
Flying Ballerina (1998)
Flatheads & Spoonies (1999)
Vinyl Killer (2001)
Mostly Ape (2002)
Live: Hoboken, NJ 5/14/2004 (2004)
El Tubador/The Peleton (2005)
Battles Ole (2005)

Lineup
Drums - Tony Nozero
Tuba - Brian Wolff
Guitar - Neal McKeeby
Andrew Gilchrist (on The Peloton/El Tubador)

References

Righteous Babe Records artists
Musical groups from Austin, Texas
1995 establishments in Texas
American experimental rock groups
American musical trios
Musical groups from New York City
Musical groups established in 1995